Chendar Rural District is in Chendar District of Savojbolagh County, Alborz province, Iran. At the census of 2006, its population was 12,110 in 3,537 households, and in the most recent census of 2016, it had increased to 13,952 in 4,694 households. The largest of its 23 villages is Kordan, with 3,795 people.

References 

Savojbolagh County

Rural Districts of Alborz Province

Populated places in Alborz Province

Populated places in Savojbolagh County